The IX Sydney International Piano Competition took place at the Seymour Centre in Sydney from 16 July to 2 August 2008.

It was won by Konstantin Shamray.

Jury

  Warren Thomson (chairman)
  Michael Brimer
  Manana Doidjashvili
  Aquiles Delle Vigne
  Norma Fisher
  Choong-Mo Kang 
  Ian Munro
  Arie Vardi
  Zhou Guangren

Prizes

Works commissioned for the competition
 Andrew Ford - Thin air
 Roger Smalley - Morceau de Concours

Competition results (by rounds)

First round
16–17 July 2008

  Charlie Albright
  Fernando Altamura
  Manuel Araujo
  Marco Ciampi
  Sean Chen
  Ran Dank
  Christopher Devine
  John Fisher
  Balázs Fülei
  David Fung
  Adam Herd
  Elizaveta Ivanova
  Shizuka Susanna Salvemini
  Miya Kazauka
  Tomoki Kitamura
  Tatyana Kolesova
  Eduard Kunz
  Ka-Ling Colleen Lee
  Miyeon Lee
  Ryan McEvoy McCullough
  José Menor Martín
  Hoang Pham
  Yoonsoo Rhee
  Sergey Saratovsky
  Takashi Sato
  Konstantin Shamray
  Yekwon Sunwoo
  Daniil Tsvetkov
  Mariangela Vacatello
  Xun Wang
  Wojciech Wisniewski
  Alexei Yemtsov
  Chun-Chieh Yen
  Feng Zhang
  Xi-Xi Zhou
  Hao Zhu
  Eric Zuber

Quarterfinals
21–22 July 2008

  Charlie Albright
  Fernando Altamura
  Sean Chen
  Ran Dank
  Christopher Devine
  David Fung
  Tomoki Kitamura
  Tatyana Kolesova
  Miyeon Lee
  José Menor Martín
  Hoang Pham
  Yoonsoo Rhee
  Shizuka Susanna Salvemini
  Sergey Saratovsky
  Takashi Sato
  Konstantin Shamray
  Daniil Tsvetkov
  Mariangela Vacatello
  Alexei Yemtsov
  Hao Zhu
  Eric Zuber

Semifinals
23–25 July 2008

  Charlie Albright
  Ran Dank
  Tomoki Kitamura
  Tatyana Kolesova
  Miyeon Lee
  Hoang Pham
  Shizuka Susanna Salvemini
  Takashi Sato
  Konstantin Shamray
  Daniil Tsvetkov
  Mariangela Vacatello
  Eric Zuber

Final
29 July – 2 August 2008

 Concertos
  Ran Dank — Mozart: 20th, Prokofiev: 3rd
  Tomoki Kitamura — Mozart: 17th, Beethoven: 4th
  Tatyana Kolesova — Mozart: 20th, Saint-Saëns: 2nd
  Takashi Sato — Mozart: 27th, Beethoven: 5th
  Konstantin Shamray — Mozart: 27th; Prokofiev: 2nd
  Eric Zuber — Mozart: 20th, Tchaikovsky: 1st

References
 Sydney International Piano Competition

 
July 2008 events in Australia
August 2008 events in Australia
2008 in Australian music
2000s in Sydney